Tomasz Mackiewicz (13 January 1975 – c. 26 January 2018) was a Polish high-altitude climber. He died on an eight-thousander Nanga Parbat, known as the "Killer Mountain", in Pakistan.

Early life and expeditions 
Born in Działoszyn, Poland. At the age of 12, together with his parents, he moved from Działoszyn to Częstochowa, where he later attended high school. While living in Częstochowa, he was addicted to heroin for several years.

In 2008, Mackiewicz was awarded a "feat of the year" award along with Mark Klonowski for an extensive traverse of Mount Logan. In 2009 he summitted Khan Tengri  as a solo climber. He tried several times to summit Nanga Parbat in winter.
He was the first climber in the world who climbed an eight-thousander in the alpine style in winter, for which he was nominated for the Piolet d'Or award.

Disappearance 
At the summit, Revol noticed Mackiewicz's bad condition and started taking him down. According to Revol, he could not walk, see or even communicate and was bleeding profusely from his mouth and nose. She secured him from the wind in a crevasse, called for help and started her trip down the mountain. Mackiewicz had developed severe frostbite and snow blindness. It is also believed that he was in the later stages of high-altitude pulmonary edema and high-altitude cerebral edema. Revol had mild frostbite on five toes.
 
Another Polish team that was attempting a nearby summit of K2 was called for rescue.
 
Ludovic Giambiasi, Revol's partner, wrote on a Facebook post:  Revol was later carried to Islamabad for treatment. Mackiewicz most likely died within 24 hours, but the cause is unknown and his body has not been found.

In March 2018, his father, Witold, received a death certificate from Pakistan, in which the date of his death was given as 30 January 2018.

Personal life
Mackiewicz was married to Joanna, with whom he divorced; he had two sons with her (twin brothers Maks and Xawery) and a daughter Tonia. Xawery's ashes were carried to Khan Tengri. He was in an informal relationship with Anna Solska, with whom he had a daughter, Zoya; they also raised Antek, Anna's son.

See also
List of people who disappeared

References

External links
 Blog Tomasz Mackiewicz

1975 births
2010s missing person cases
Missing people
Missing person cases in Pakistan
Nanga Parbat
Polish mountain climbers
People from Pajęczno County